A fortified gateway is an element of a variety of fortified structures, such as a castle or walled town. Fortified gates or gateways appear in the Bronze Age and reach into the modern times.

City gate

Gatehouse

Torburg

In German, a "Torburg", lit. "gate castle", is a relatively autonomous and heavily fortified gateway of a castle or town. Medieval castle gateways of this type usually have additional fortifications in front of them. A common form is the tower gateway (German: Turmtorburg); a variant is the bastion gateway (German: Halbrundturmtorburg). They are common in Europe.

Examples in Europe

France
Château du Sou in Lacenas

Germany

Deutsches Tor in Metz
Ehrentor, Eigelsteintorburg, Hahnentorburg, Kuniberts Tower, Schaafentor and Severin Gate in Cologne
Town fortifications of Erkelenz
Friedländer Tor in Neubrandenburg
Marching Gate and Bridge Gate in Aachen as well as Aachen's city walls
Upper Gate in Neuss
Fortified gateway of Seeburg Palace
Star Gate in Bonn
Fortified gateway of Stolberg Castle in Stolberg (Rhineland)
Porta Alba, Porta Nigra and Imperial Baths in Trier

Romania (Transylvania)
Stundturm in Sighișoara

United Kingdom
Westgate at Canterbury
Balkerne Gate at Colchester
Bargate, Southampton
Castle Upton in Templepatrick, Northern Ireland
Kingsgate and Westgate, Winchester
Monnow Bridge, Monmouth - the only surviving type in Britain with the gatehouse positioned on the bridge
Portgate on Hadrian's Wall
Five Arches Gate and Whitesand Gate at Tenby
Micklegate Bar and other gates at York

On coats of arms
 Bad Kissingen
 Dinslaken
 Königswinter
 Limerick
 Neubrandenburg
 Uedem
 Wassenberg
 Wiehl

See also
Barbican
Bridge castle
Gate tower

Castle architecture
Types of gates
Fortification (architectural elements)